Randall Desmond Archibald (February 21, 1960 – August 14, 2018), better known by his stage name Randy Rampage, was a Canadian musician and founding member, bass player and vocalist of the Canadian hardcore band D.O.A., along with Joe Keithley and Chuck Biscuits. They are often referred to as the "founders" of hardcore punk along with Black Flag, Bad Brains, Angry Samoans, the Germs, Negative Trend, and Middle Class. Their second album Hardcore '81 was thought by many to have been the first actual reference to the second wave of the American punk sound as hardcore. Hardcore 81 included a fourth member of the lineup Dave Gregg.

He was also the lead singer of the thrash metal band Annihilator in 1988–1989 and again from 1998 to 2000.

Musical career
He played on D.O.A.'s seminal early punk albums Something Better Change and Hardcore '81, along with vocalist/guitarist Joey Shithead, drummer Chuck Biscuits and guitarist Dave Gregg in Hardcore '81. Rampage left D.O.A. in 1981 but returned in the year 2000 after a nearly two-decade absence. He played on their 2002 Win the Battle album but then left the band again. He rejoined D.O.A. in 2007, remained in the lineup through 2008 and was featured on their album, Northern Avenger, produced by Bob Rock. On the eve of the Northern Avenger tour, it was announced that Rampage was leaving D.O.A. once again.

Rampage was the vocalist for the Canadian speed metal/thrash metal band Annihilator. He first joined the band in 1988, appearing on their debut album Alice in Hell (1989), and left after its accompanying tour. Around 1998, Rampage returned to Annihilator and recorded another album with them Criteria for a Black Widow (1999), after which he left once again to rejoin D.O.A.

Rampage recorded a self-titled EP in 1982, Randy Rampage.  It featured musicians also known as the Sick Ones, Chuck Biscuits, Brad Kent, Zippy Pinhead, and Benny Doro.

Randy was a key figure in Susanne Tabata's documentary film Bloodied But UnBowed, a historical look at the birth of the Vancouver punk rock scene and the development of hardcore punk on the West coast of North America during the 1978–1983 timeframe. He appears in this film along with Art Bergmann, Jello Biafra, Joe Keithley, Duff McKagan, Henry Rollins, Ron Reyes (ex-Black Flag), Penelope Houston, Ginger Coyote, Buck Cherry (John Armstrong), Gerry Hannah, Jim Cummins AKA I, Braineater, Zippy Pinhead, Brad Kent, Keith Morris, Greg Hetson and many others. Bands featured include D.O.A., Subhumans (Canadian band), Pointed Sticks, Young Canadians, The Dishrags, The Modernettes, among others.

Randy Rampage had many other projects, including Rampage, Stress Factor 9, Fake It Big Time, Ground Zero, Iron Gypsy, Requiem, Riff Raff, and The 45s.

As the frontman of metal band Stress Factor 9 along with Annihilator drummer Ray Hartmann, guitarist Francis Frightful of Singapore band Opposition Party, guitarist Kick of Vertical After, and bass player Duane Chaos of 22nd Century.

Rampage's last project was Rampage, a band that included Duane Chaos, The Great Baldini, Brent Johnson, Tim Bitz, Pinto Stiletto, and their LP project was recorded by John Webster. Unreleased at the time of his death.

Rampage died on August 14, 2018.

Discography
D.O.A.
 Something Better Change (1980)
 Hardcore '81 (1981)
 Win the Battle (2002)
 Northern Avenger (2008)

Annihilator
 Alice in Hell (1989)
 Bag of Tricks (1994)
 In Command (1996)
 Criteria for a Black Widow (1999)
 Total Annihilation (2010)

Stress Factor 9
 Brainwarp Mindspin (2006)

Randy Rampage
 Randy Rampage EP (1982)

Death
Rampage died on August 14, 2018 at his home in Vancouver from an apparent heart attack, aged 58.

Randy Rampage aka Randall Desmond Archibald is buried in Mountain View Cemetery in Vancouver BC.  A monument to his name is under construction.

References

External links 
 Stress Factor 9
 Bloodied But Unbowed

1960 births
2018 deaths
Canadian heavy metal singers
Canadian punk rock bass guitarists
Annihilator (band) members
D.O.A. (band) members
Musicians from Vancouver